Ozhimuri is a 2012 Indian Malayalam-language period drama film, directed by Madhupal and written by Jeyamohan and starring Lal, Mallika, Asif Ali, Bhavana and Shweta Menon in lead roles. The original songs and background score were composed by Bijibal. The film opened to critical acclaim but did not fare well at the box office. It was an official selection in the Indian Panorama section of the 43rd International Film Festival of India. It is widely regarded as one of the defining movies of the Malayalam New Wave.

Ozhimuri is based on the story of the book 'Uravidangal' by veteran bilingual writer Jeyamohan. The title of the work refers to the matrilineal system that prevailed in the Nair community in the erstwhile southern Travancore. A prominent feature of the matrilineal system was that properties were enjoyed by successors of the women in the family. The women were educated and bold, with mothers often being stronger than fathers.  They enjoyed freedom in all respects. However, when the system was marginalized in the 1940s, women lost all their powers and soon became 'slaves' in the hands of a feudal male-dominated society. The movie exposes the complexities of a period of transition from a matrilineal to patrilineal society."Ozhimuri" means 'divorce record' in both Tamil and Malayalam. In the matrilineal system, women were free to divorce their husbands if they were not having a sound relationship. The 'ozhimuris' or small palm-leaf pieces recording divorces of couples still stand testimony to the freedom, which women enjoyed those days.

Plot
The story lays open the ego clashes and complexities of a period through the eyes of its lead character Thanu Pillai (Lal), who witnesses the tale of three women, his mother, wife and son's wife.

Fifty-five years old Meenakshi Pillai who is married to Seventy-one years old Thanu Pillai files a for divorce against her husband and ask back the properties he had her transfer to him during the pendency of their marriage. Advocate Balamany who is the defense lawyer tries to convince Meenakshi and her son Sarath Chandran to withdraw the case on various occasions. Sarath tells her that his father was abusive and harsh towards him and his mother. And also tells her about Kali Pillai, Thanu Pillai's mother who was lord of a feudal family which followed matrilineal succession and had considerable power in the local politics and among people. Thanu Pillai was also very harsh towards his mother and even hated the matrilineal system and that's why he married Meenakshi who was from a Nair family which followed patrilineal system. Even though Meenakshi was from a poorer family Kali Pillai loved her and even advised her many times to take a stronger stand against her husband instead of submitting to patriarchy but Meenakshi remained submissive to her husband all through their marriage. Sarath and Balamany slowly develop a relationship.

As the case progresses more and more things from the past are revealed from the perspectives of various people in Thanu Pillai's life. Meenakshi lived through these cycle of abuse because she knew that her husband deeply loved his son. It is also revealed that the only reason  Sarath is alive and in good health is because of his father. This reveal make Sarath change his view towards Thanu Pillai. It's also revealed that Sivan Pillai, Thanu Pillai's father was a wrestler who died penniless because Kali Pillai divorced him to live with a younger, educated man. This scarred a young Thanu Pillai deeply and causing him to be harsher towards his mother and become abusive towards his wife even though he loved both of them. Kali Pillai before her death ask Meenakshi to call Thanu Pillai but he refuses to see her, which causes Kali to storm out of the house and die in the streets. Thinking about his mother's death causes Thanu Pillai to suffer a heart attack later, that is a few months ago. After recovering he asks his wife what has caused his mother to leave the home and accuses his wife for hurting his mother and even calls her a slave. This deeply affects Meenakshi and that's what drove her to file for divorce. Who tells Balamany that she wants to live and die independent like her mother in law. Thanu Pillai suffers another heart attack but he is cared by Meenakshi and recovers. Next day in court, Thanu Pillai, Sarath and Balamany is hopeful that Meenakshi Amma will withdraw her divorce petition as she took care of Thanu Pillai when he was ill. But she insists in court that she wants divorce. A pained Thanu Pillai agrees to all demands of Meenakshi in court. On his way back home with Sarath, he reveals to his son that he was abusive towards Meenakshi and Kali Pillai because he was afraid of them due to his father's fate. He tells his son that Balamany is a strong woman and approves of their relationship, but he also advises his son to never be scared of her, and that fearing his wife made him try to put her under his feet always, which was a mistake. When they reach home, Thanu Pillai and Sarath are surprised to find Meenakshi at home. She had prepared a sweet dish and hands it over to Thanu and says she will come to look after him when he is not well, but not as a wife. Meenakshi who is now free woman now, spends rest of her life in the house Kali Pillai had gifted her, with pride and self-respect like Kali Pillai did.

Cast

Production

Earlier it was reported that Padmapriya was selected to play one of the three female lead. But later Mallika replaced her. Actor-turned-director Madhupal invited 65 fresh faces in the age group of 10–70 years for this film.

Reception

Critical response

'Ozhimuri' released with positive response.Metromatinee.com gave positive review with a verdict : "Impressive".Nowrunning.com gave 3/5 stars and concluded saying that "Ozhimuri burns slowly, spurting off those sparks every now and then, and even when the smoke and fire appears to have died out, you sense that crimson embers lie glowing and buried deep inside."IBN Live gave a mixed review by saying that the movie is "Satisfying".

Accolades 
 Best Second film of the year 2012 Kerala State Government Film Award [(Ozhimuri)]
 Best Film 2012 Pearl Award Qatar Kerala Film Producers Film [(Ozhimuri)]
 Best Director award Jaihind Television 2012 film [(Ozhimuri)]
 Best Director award Doordharsan Nirav award film [(Ozhimuri)]
 Best Second Film Kerala Film Critics award 2012 of the movie [(Ozhimuri)]
 Best Actor Special Jury National award Government of India to Lal film [(Ozhimuri)]
 Director of Excellence award from Indonesia Film Festival 2013 film Ozhimuri
 Best Actor Lal Kerala Film Critics award 2012
 Best Actress Swetha menon Kerala film critics award 2012
 Best Director of Photography Azhagappan Kerala Film Critics Award 2012
 Best Music Director Kerala state Government film award Bijibal 2012
 Best Costumer SB Satheeshan Kerala State Government Film awards 2012
 Best Scriptwriter B Jeyamohan Kerala Film Critics Award 2012

References

External links

http://www.thehindu.com/arts/cinema/article3686504.ece

2012 films
2010s Malayalam-language films
Films about divorce